C-sharp minor is a minor scale based on C, with the pitches C, D, E, F, G, A, and B. Its key signature consists of four sharps.

The C-sharp natural minor scale is:

Changes needed for the melodic and harmonic versions of the scale are written in with accidentals as necessary. The C-sharp harmonic minor and melodic minor scales are:

Its relative major is E major. Its parallel major, C-sharp major, is usually written instead as the enharmonic key of D-flat major, since C-sharp major’s key signature with seven sharps is not normally used. Its enharmonic equivalent, D-flat minor, having eight flats including the B, has a similar problem. Therefore, C-sharp minor is often used as the parallel minor for D-flat major. (The same enharmonic situation occurs with the keys of A-flat major and G-sharp minor, and in some cases, with the keys of G-flat major and F-sharp minor.)

Classical music in this key

There are only two known symphonies in the 18th century written in this key. One of them is by Joseph Martin Kraus, who appears to have found the key difficult since he later rewrote it in C minor. In the following two centuries, C-sharp minor symphonies remained rare. Notable examples are the second movement Adagio of Anton Bruckner's Symphony No. 7, the first movement of Gustav Mahler's Symphony No. 5 and Prokofiev's Symphony No. 7.

This key occurs more often in piano literature from the 18th century onwards. Domenico Scarlatti wrote just two keyboard sonatas in C-sharp minor, K. 246 and K. 247. After Beethoven's Piano Sonata No. 14 (Moonlight Sonata), the key became more frequent in the piano repertoire. Beethoven himself used this key again in the outer movements of his String Quartet No. 14 (Op. 131, 1826). Even so, Johannes Brahms still felt the need to rewrite his C-sharp minor piano quartet in C minor, which was published as Piano Quartet No. 3 in C minor, Op. 60.

Alkan composed the second movement (Adagio) for Concerto for Solo Piano in C-sharp minor.

Frédéric Chopin often wrote in this key: examples include the Fantaisie-Impromptu, Études Op. 10, No. 4 and Op. 25, No. 7, Scherzo No. 3 (Op. 39), Waltz Op. 64, No. 2, Polonaise Op. 26 No. 1, the Prelude opus 45 and Nocturnes No. 7 (Op. 27, No. 1) and No. 20 (Lento con gran espressione). More examples of works in C-sharp minor include Rachmaninoff's Prelude in C-sharp minor (Op. 3, No. 2), Scriabin's Étude in C-sharp minor, Op. 2, No. 1 (Scriabin), Franz Liszt's Hungarian Rhapsody No. 2, and Tchaikovsky's Piano Sonata in C-sharp minor.

Piano concertos written in C-sharp minor include Erich Wolfgang Korngold's Piano Concerto for the Left Hand, Op. 17, Nikolai Rimsky-Korsakov's Piano Concerto, and others by Ferdinand Ries, Xaver Scharwenka, Amy Beach, Miriam Hyde and Issay Dobrowen.

Franz Berwald and Dimitri Shostakovich wrote a violin concerto in c sharp minor.

Jules Van Nuffel wrote his psalm setting  for choir and organ in C-sharp minor.

References

External links

Musical keys
Minor scales